Lover's Guitar is the thirty-seventh studio album by American guitarist Chet Atkins. It was released in 1969.

Track listing

Side one
 "Theme from Zorba the Greek" (Mikis Theodorakis) – 2:58
 "Hawaiian Wedding Song" (Al Hoffman, Charles King, Dick Manning) – 3:13
 "The Look of Love" (Burt Bacharach, Hal David) – 2:50
 "Cajita de Musica (Little Music Box)" – 1:59
 "Cancion del Viento (Song of the Wind)" – 3:48
 "Estudio Brillante" (Francisco Tárrega) – 3:35

Side two
 "La Madrugada (The Early Dawn)" – 2:25
 "If I Should Lose You" (Ralph Rainger, Leo Robin) – 2:30
 "Those Were the Days" (Gene Raskin) – 2:55
 "The Odd Folks of Okracoke" (John D. Loudermilk) – 2:11
 "Until It's Time for You to Go" (Buffy Sainte-Marie) – 3:42
 "Recuerdos de la Alhambra" (Francisco Tárrega) – 3:07

Personnel
Chet Atkins – guitar
Arranged by Chet Atkins and Bill McElhiney

References

1969 albums
Chet Atkins albums
Albums produced by Bob Ferguson (music)
RCA Victor albums